Like all municipalities of Puerto Rico, Cidra is subdivided into administrative units called barrios, which are roughly comparable to minor civil divisions. The barrios and subbarrios, in turn, are further subdivided into smaller local populated place areas/units called sectores (sectors in English). The types of sectores may vary, from normally sector to urbanización to reparto to barriada to residencial, among others.

List of sectors by barrio

Arenas
 Blancas
 Bosque Real
 Campo Bello
 Domingo Montalván
 El Retiro
 Fanduca
 Gándaras 
 Isona
 Justo Rodríguez
 La Liendre
 Las Flores
 Los Padilla
 Los Pinos
 Macelo
 Monticello
 Nogueras
 Permo Quiles
 Quintas de Monticello
 Santa Clara
 Talí o El Trolley
 Valle Real
 Villas de Santa María
 Vista Alegre

Bayamón
 Aguedo Pagán
 Alturas del Arenal
 Brisas del Campo
 Brisas del Lago
 Campo Primavera
 Calo Rolón
 Cidra Valley
 Cintrón
 Ciudad Primavera
 Delgado
 El Lago
 El Puente
 Estancias de Cidra
 Fito Medina
 Gándaras II
 Hacienda La Cima
 Hacienda Victoria
 Juan del Valle
 La Glorieta
 La Muralla
 Las Mercedes
 Las Nereidas
 Los Cotto
 Los Pianos
 Los Ramos
 Machuquillo
 Mira Monte
 Mónaco
 Monchito Ramos
 Paseo Figueroa
 Primitiva Vázquez
 Quebradillas
 Reparto Maritza
 Rivera
 Tabo Merced
 Treasure Valley
 Treasure Island Gardens
 Trinidad
 Villa Encantada
 Villa Rosa
 Villa San Martín
 Vista Monte
 Vistas de Sabana
 Vistas de Sabanera

Beatriz
 Bambú
 Brisas de Montecarlo
 Brisas del Plata
 Campito
 Centeno Quiles
 Chavón
 Clavijo
 Ciudad Primavera
 Colinas de Beatriz I
 Colinas de Beatriz II
 Colinas del Capitán
 Colinas Verdes
 El Llano
 Hacienda La Cima
 Huertas
 Juan González
 La Bomba
 La Jurado 
 La Vega
 Las Cruces
 Los Gómez
 Los Soto
 Monte Verde o Colinas
 Muñoz Grillo
 Ortíz
 Pesquera
 Valle de Beatriz
 Valle Verde o Sapera
 Virginia

Ceiba

 Agustín Cruz Ojeda
 Agustín Santos
 Carrasquillo
 Delgado o El Llano
 Escalera
 Euclides Rivera
 Estancias de Monte Río
 Falcón
 Flores
 Garced
 González
 Hevias
 Jacinto Hernández
 Joya Abajo
 La Frontera
 Las Paletas
 Meléndez
 Naranjo
 Pablo Santos
 Peregín Santos
 Rafi Ruíz
 Ruíz

Certenejas*
 Basilio Meléndez
 Campo Lago
 Capilla
 Cortés
 Daniel Pagán
 El Puente
 González
 Jesús Morales
 Juan Colón
 La Inmaculada
 La Península
 Los Meléndez 
 Las Palmas
 Los Oliques
 Los Yuya
 Monte Verde
 Morales
 Nogales
 Palmeras
 Ramos
 San José (Laberinto)
 Urbanización Estancias del Bosque
 Urbanización Hacienda La Paloma
 Urbanización Hacienda Primavera
 Urbanización Sabanaera
 Urbanización Villas del Bosque
 Vélez

Cidra barrio-pueblo
 Barriada Ferrer
 Domingo Rodríguez
 El Cielito
 Fernández
 Ferrer
 Freire
 Jardines de Cidra
 La Cuatro
 Los Almendros
 Práxedes Santiago
 Samuel Quiles
 Santa Teresita
 Villa del Carmen

Honduras
 Bernard
 Caña
 Díaz
 El Malecón
 Galindo
 La Loma
 Muñiz
 Polo Torres
 Puente Blanco
 San José

Monte Llano
 Bloquera
 Carruso
 Dones
 Escuela
 Fernández
 González
 Martín Reyes
 Monchito Pérez
 Nuñez o La Capilla
 Ortíz
 Resbalosa
 Rodríguez
 Solano

Rabanal
Although Rabanal officially consists of only one single barrio, it is traditionally subdivided into two areas or sub-barrios:

Rabanal Norte
 Almirante
 Comunidades Unidas
 Cortés
 Finca Alicea
 Flores de la Riviera o Las Flores
 Haciendas de Cidra o El Banco
 Jardines de Rabanal
 Jardines de la Cumbre
 La Milagrosa
 Las Jaguas
 Mejías
 Meléndez

Rabanal Sur
 Alejandro
 Alturas de Cidra
 Borrero
 Colinas de Buenos Aires
 Diego Rivera
 El Buen Pastor
 El Paraíso
 Fátima
 Jolujo
 Jiménez o Loma de los Jiménez
 La Cumbre
 La Loma
 La Pastora
 Lomas de Rabanal
 Los Bravos
 Los Dos Mangoes
 Los Panes
 Malavé
 Millo Reyes
 Monseñor Ignacio González 
 Piñeiro
 San José
 Tierra Linda
 Tres y Medio (3½)

Rincón
 Barriada I
 Barriada II
 Candelas
 Chichón
 Cotto
 Entrada Capilla
 García I
 García II
 La Herradura
 La Línea
 La Veguita
 Los López
 Nogueras
 Rancho Díaz
 Rafael Berríos
 Torres
 Villa Rosa
 Vitín La Torre

Río Abajo
 Berríos
 Capilla
 Castrodad
 Doce
 González
 La Vega
 Los Meléndez
 Los Nieves
 Luna
 Ortíz
 Rivera
 Vázquez
 Viejo Almacén

Salto
 El Mirador
 Esperanza Rivera
 González
 La Tosca
 Luto Félix
 Luz María
 Martín Ramos
 Rivera
 San José

Sud
 Anaya
 Baltazar Rodríguez
 Casillas
 Colina del Paraíso
 Collazo
 Domingo Alejandro
 El Gallíto
 El Tamarindo
 Flores
 Franco
 Jardines de Villa del Carmen
 La Ceiba
 La Loma
 Los Hernández Arriba
 Montalván
 Palmasola
 Poldo Escribano
 Práxedes Santiago
 Ramos Antonini
 Rodríguez
 Torres
 Valle Universitario
 Valles de Cidra
 Villa del Carmen
 Vista Hermosa
 Vistas de Cidra

Toíta
 Capilla
 Cruz
 Díaz
 Federico Ramos
 Filemón
 Llavona
 Los Cotto
 Rivera
 Rubén González
 Valles del Bravo

Note:

* - Formerly part of Barrio Bayamón, officially constituted by Law 77 of 2009

Source: Cidra (Puerto Rico) - Wikipedia

See also

 List of communities in Puerto Rico

References

Cidra
Cidra